T. J. Lowther (born May 17, 1986 in Salt Lake City, Utah) is an American actor. He started as a child star, appearing in Neon City in 1991 at the age of 5. He is known for his role as Philip Perry in the 1993 Clint Eastwood film A Perfect World starring Kevin Costner.   Lowther has moved into more roles on television, including a guest star role on an episode of the TV series Grey's Anatomy.

Lowther graduated from the University of Southern California in 2008.

Filmography

References

External links 
 

1986 births
Living people
American male child actors
American male film actors
American male television actors
Male actors from Salt Lake City
University of Southern California alumni